Osvaldo Tavares Oliveira, known as Figo (born 14 July 1986), is a Cape Verdean football player who plays as a forward for Vilafranquense.

Club career
He made his professional debut in the Segunda Liga for Oriental on 22 August 2015 in a game against Porto B.

References

1986 births
Living people
Cape Verdean footballers
Sporting Clube da Praia players
Estrela dos Amadores players
G.D. Tourizense players
Cape Verdean expatriate footballers
Expatriate footballers in Portugal
Clube Oriental de Lisboa players
C.D. Primeiro de Agosto players
Expatriate footballers in Angola
Girabola players
C.R. Caála players
Liga Portugal 2 players
Association football forwards